Francis Xavier Weninger (31 October 1805, Wildhaus, Styria, Austria (now Slovenia) - 29 June 1888, Cincinnati, Ohio) was an Austrian Jesuit missionary and author.

Life 
When already a priest and doctor of theology, he joined the Society of Jesus in 1832 and in 1841 was sent to Innsbruck, where he taught theology, history, and Hebrew. As the Revolution of 1848 impeded his further usefulness at home, he left Europe and went to the United States. During his forty years he visited almost every state of the Union, preaching in English, French, or German, as best suited the nationality of his hearers. In the year 1854 alone he delivered nearly a thousand sermons, and in 1864 he preached about forty-five missions.

Works 
He published forty works in German, sixteen in English, eight in French, three in Latin. Among his principal works are:

English
 Manual of the Catholic Religion (Ratisbon, 1858)
 Easter in Heaven (1863)
 Protestantism and Infidelity. An Appeal to Candid Americans (1861, 1864)
 On the Apostolical and Infallible Authority of the Pope, When Teaching the Faithful, and on his Relation to a General Council (1868)
 Photographic Views: or, Religious and Moral Truths Reflected in the Universe (1873)
 Reply to Hon. R.W. Thompson, Secretary of the Navy, Addressed to the American People (1877)
 Lives of the Saints, With a Practical Instruction on the Life of each Saint, for Every day in Year, v.2 (1877)
 Original, Short and Practical Sermons for Every Sunday of the Ecclesiastical Year (1881)

German
 Die apostolische Vollmacht des Papstes in Glaubens-Entscheidungen (1841)
 Ostern im Himmel (1866)
 Kleiner Kathechismus der Christlichen Lehre zum Gebrauch für Katholische Schulen (1866)
 Die Unfehlbarkeit des Papstes als Lehrer der Kirche (1869)
 Der monat Maria (1878)
 Vollstandiges Handbuch der Christ-Katholischen Religion, fur Katecheten, Lehrer (unknown)

French
 Catholicisme, Protestantisme et Infidélité : Appel aux Américains de Bonne Foi (1866)

References 
 
 Woodstock Letters, XVIII, 43-68; 
 Hugo von Hurter, Nomenclator, III, 1217 sqq.

External links 
 Catholic Encyclopedia article

1805 births
1888 deaths
Academic staff of the University of Innsbruck
19th-century Slovenian people
19th-century Austrian Jesuits
Austrian Roman Catholic missionaries
Austro-Hungarian emigrants to the United States
People from the Municipality of Selnica ob Dravi
Jesuit missionaries in the United States
19th-century Slovenian writers
19th-century Austrian male writers
19th-century American Roman Catholic priests